Héctor Martínez may refer to:

Politics
 Héctor Martínez Colón, Puerto Rican politician
 Héctor Ruiz Martínez (1943–1986), Puerto Rican mayor and teacher
 Héctor Martínez Maldonado (born 1968), Puerto Rican senator

Sports
 Héctor Martínez (baseball announcer), baseball announcer
 Héctor Martínez (outfielder) (1939–1999), Cuban baseball player
 Héctor Martínez (footballer, born 1947), Argentine football midfielder and manager
 Héctor Martínez (footballer, born 1967), Paraguayan football midfielder
 Héctor Martínez (footballer, born 1995), Spanish footballer
 Héctor Martínez (footballer, born 1998), Argentine footballer
 Héctor Martínez (footballer, born 1999), Spanish footballer

Other
 Héctor Martínez Arteche (1934–2011), Mexican painter and muralist
 Héctor Martínez Muñoz (1924–1991), member of the Supreme Court of Puerto Rico